Nothing's Real is the debut studio album by English singer Shura, released on 8 July 2016 by Polydor Records. The album was met with positive reviews from music critics.

Critical reception

Nothing's Real received generally positive reviews from music critics. At Metacritic, which assigns a normalised rating out of 100 to reviews from mainstream publications, the album received an average score of 79, based on 18 reviews. Heather Phares of AllMusic wrote that Nothing's Real "boasts richer songwriting and wider-ranging sounds than might have been expected", concluding that the album "marks Shura as the kind of smart pop star the 2010s need." Rob Mesure of musicOMH called the album "beautifully constructed" and stated, "The sound might be '80s, but this is undeniably now, and Shura a new star in 2016's increasingly bible-black night." Andrew Paschal of PopMatters commented that the album is "packed with solid, infectious, deeply catchy pop songs, most all of which can stand alone just as easily as they can run with the pack." Writing for Pitchfork, Laura Snapes remarked that Shura is "at the vanguard of a scene of young queer pop stars who are updating the '80s model of self-sufficient, fully liberated mainstream pop", adding that the album "offers a fresh vision for pop's new reality."

Lisa Henderson of Clash opined, "Previously heard tracks still stand up as pop juggernauts but there's an obvious growth that has happened during the two-year wait; sonically and lyrically, Shura is at her most urgent and incisive." Harriet Gibsone of The Guardian felt that the album's "more uptempo moments are especially promising; melodies so satisfying she should consider handing them to a major-league artist in need of a reboot." Hannah Ziegler of Exclaim! viewed the album as "a neon sugar rush that occasionally fizzles out with filler tracks", commenting that it "ultimately leaves a lasting impression". Joe Levy of Rolling Stone dubbed the album "a tangle of glam and glum" and wrote that Shura's videos "make clear the subjects of these songs ['What's It Gonna Be?', '2Shy' and 'Indecision'] are often women, but on record her work is open-ended—a map to a treasure that's just never there." Hannah J. Davies of Q magazine expressed, "Avoiding the abstract experimentalism of her sample-heavy single 'The Space Tapes', she gives a fine display of how to be both retro and radio-friendly."

Accolades

Commercial performance
Nothing's Real debuted at number 13 on the UK Albums Chart, selling 4,777 copies in its first week.

Track listing

Notes
  signifies an additional producer

Personnel
Credits adapted from the liner notes of Nothing's Real.

Musicians

 Shura – synths ; programming ; vocals ; keyboards ; backing vocals, programming ; percussion ; guitar ; synth bass 
 Joel Laslett Pott – guitar ; keyboards, synths ; programming ; bass ; backing vocals ; percussion ; piano ; synth bass ; additional programming ; electric guitar 
 Luke Saunders – synths ; synth bass, programming ; guitar ; backing vocals ; bass guitar ; electric guitar, keyboards 
 Matt Ritson – drums, additional beats, percussion, samples 
 Will Ritson – drums, percussion, PO-12 
 Kirsty Mangan – strings 
 Rachel Lander – strings 
 Greg Kurstin – keyboards, drums, bass ; guitar 
 Al Shux – programming, percussion, synth bass, keyboards, synths 
 Maxwell Cooke – synth bass 
 Ally Wilkinson – drums ; percussion 
 Stephen Roberts – drums ; percussion 
 Dan Grech-Marguerat – additional programming 
 Giacki Watterson – beat programming 
 Jonny Pilcher – piano

Technical

 Joel Laslett Pott – production ; recording engineering ; additional production 
 Shura – production ; additional production 
 Daniel Moyler – recording engineering 
 David Wrench – mixing 
 Marta Salogni – mixing assistance 
 Steph Marziano – mixing assistance 
 Tom Stanley – recording engineering 
 Carey Willetts – recording engineering 
 Mark "Spike" Stent – mixing 
 Michael Freeman – mixing assistance 
 Geoff Swan – mixing assistance 
 Greg Kurstin – production, recording engineering 
 Alex Pasco – recording engineering 
 Julian Burg – recording engineering 
 Al Shux – production, recording engineering 
 Dan Grech-Marguerat – mixing 
 Mandy Parnell – mastering

Artwork
 Mat Maitland – art direction
 Shura – art direction
 Louise Pomeroy – illustrations
 Andrew Whitton – photography

Charts

Notes

References

2016 debut albums
Albums produced by Al Shux
Albums produced by Greg Kurstin
Interscope Records albums
Polydor Records albums
Shura (English singer) albums